The Italian Union of Tourism, Commerce and Service Workers (UILTuCS) is a trade union representing workers in the service sector in Italy.

The union was founded in 1950, as the Italian Union of Employees of Commercial Companies, on the initiative of Umberto Pagani.  It was a founding affiliate of the Italian Labour Union.  In 1962, it became the Italian Union of Tourism, Commercial Company and Related Employees, then in 1977 the Italian Union of Hotel, Canteen and Spa Workers merged in, and the union adopted its current name.  By 1997, the union claimed 72,313 members.

General Secretaries
1950: Umberto Pagani
Giovanni Gatti
1981: Raffaele Vanni
1998: Bruno Boco

External links

References

Hospitality industry trade unions
Trade unions in Italy
Trade unions established in 1969